Halul Island is one of the most important islands belonging to the State of Qatar. One of the main bases for the Qatari Navy is located in Halul. The Coasts and Borders Security also have a base of operations on the island.

It was frequented by pearling boats in the early 1900s.

History
James Ashley Maude documented the first known discovery of the island in July 1817, referring to it as "Hawlool Island". He wrote:

Maude also notes the island's close proximity to extensive pearling beds.

In 1823, the first map of the island was produced by Captain George Barnes Brucks. In Brucks' memoir, published posthumously in 1856, he gave a brief account of the island as well as its geographic location. He wrote that the island is high and noted the presence of wells. It is unknown if these wells were natural occurrences, such as sinkholes, or constructed by fishermen. He also remarks on the high elevation of the island and claims it was formerly known as May Island.

Scottish hydrographer James Horsburgh wrote a description of the island in his 1855 guide The India Directory. His account did not differ by much from the earlier description given by Maude in 1817.

Geography
The island lies 72 miles southeast of Ras Rakan, and around 50 miles northeast of the capital Doha. It is approximately 1 mile in length. The terrain is hilly and its highest peak is 202 feet. The island is visible from a distance of about 15 miles, and there is a reef around it which extends up to 0.2 miles offshore. The island contains the easternmost landmass of Qatar. With a distance of slightly more than 80 kilometers from the nearest point of mainland Qatar, which is Ra’s Abū Qarn on the northeastern coast and in the municipality of Al Khor, it is also the most remote island of the country. The island is susceptible to shamal winds. Located 45 miles northeast of the island is the rocky and shallow Shah Allum Shoal.

Geology
Most of the island's surface lies on the Paleozoic strata. The Cambrian period Hormuz Formation is the predominant surface layer. It is one of the only two territories of Qatar which lie on a Paleozoic surface. Iron oxides such as hematite and ochre are found on the island, but have been left unexploited due to the high costs of extraction and transportation.

Wildlife
The island serves as a habitat for several species of marine life and seabirds. Upwards of 80 mountain goats inhabit its hilly landscape, having expanded from a group of six mountain goats first transported to the island in 1963. The Ministry of Municipality and Environment (MME) is cooperating with QatarEnergy to protect and grow the island's wildlife. Among the most important initiatives taken are the planting of 400 saline-resistant trees and the establishment of protected sea turtle nesting sites.

Industry
Shortly after the commencement of oil activities, in the mid-1950s the government began investing resources to convert Halul into a major oil loading terminal. The significance of the island was further realized in the 1960s after the government began establishing offshore oil fields. Between 1964 and 1966, industrial infrastructure was constructed on the island. , the island accommodates 11 external floating roof tanks with an overall capacity of 5 million barrels of crude oil.

Halul produces its own electricity. It has nine turbo generators with a power capacity of 43 MW.

Gallery

See also

 List of islands of Qatar
 List of lighthouses in Qatar

References

Halul
Islands of the Persian Gulf
Lighthouses in Qatar